Mongolia is participating in the 2018 Asian Games in Jakarta and Palembang, Indonesia from 18 August to 2 September 2018. Mongolia made its first appearance at the Asian Games in 1974 Tehran, and have a total 137 medals, including 20 gold, 37 silver, and 80 bronze. At the previous edition in Incheon 2014, Mongolia had collected 21 medals, and standing in the 16th position in medals tally.

On 5 July 2018, Indonesia Asian Games Organizing Committee (Inasgoc) stated that Mongolia withdrew in its participation in all team events at the Games, by an official letter from the Mongolian National Olympic Committee.

Medalists

The following Mongolia competitors won medals at the Games.

|  style="text-align:left; width:78%; vertical-align:top;"|

|  style="text-align:left; width:22%; vertical-align:top;"|

Archery 

Recurve

Compound

Athletics 

Mongolia entered nine athletes (6 men's and 3 women's) to participate in the athletics competition at the Games.

Badminton 

Men

Basketball 

Summary

5x5 basketball
Mongolia men's and women's basketball team entered the competition, drawn in group A for the men's and in group Y for the women's.

Men's tournament

Roster
The following is the Mongolia roster in the men's basketball tournament of the 2018 Asian Games.

Group A

Women's tournament

Roster
The following is the Mongolia roster in the women's basketball tournament of the 2018 Asian Games.

Group Y

Quarter-final

Classification 5th–8th

Seventh place game

3x3 basketball
Mongolia national 3x3 team participated in the Games. The men's and women's team placed in pool B respectively based on the FIBA 3x3 federation ranking.

Men's tournament

Roster
The following is the Mongolia roster in the men's 3x3 basketball tournament of the 2018 Asian Games.
Purevsuren Munkh-Orgil (5)
Chuluunbaatar Ikhbayar (10)
Ariunbaatar Sukhbat (11)
Onolbaatar Enkhbaatar (13)

Pool B

Women's tournament

Roster
The following is the Mongolia roster in the women's 3x3 basketball tournament of the 2018 Asian Games.
Munkhsaikhan Tserenlkham (2)
Ganbat Minjin (6)
Batsuren Nandintsetseg (7)
Onolbaatar Khulan (13)

Pool B

Bowling 

Men

Women

Boxing 

Men

Women

Cycling

Mountain biking

Road

Track

Pursuit

Omnium

Fencing 

Individual

Team

Golf 

Men

Women

Gymnastics 

Mongolia entered two athletes to participate in the gymnastics competition at the Games. One male athlete competed in the artistic event and one female athlete in the rhythmic event.

Ju-jitsu 

Men

Women

Judo 

13 judokas (7 men's and 6 women's) competed in the individual events.

Men

Women

Mixed

Karate 

Mongolia participated in the karate competition at the Games with three men's athletes.

Kurash 

Men

Women

Modern pentathlon

Paragliding 

Men

Women

Roller sports

Speed skating

Sambo

Shooting 

Men

Women

Mixed team

Soft tennis

Sport climbing 

Combined

Squash 

Singles

Swimming

Men

Women

Mixed

Table tennis 

Individual

Team

Taekwondo 

Kyorugi

Tennis 

Men

Women

Mixed

Triathlon 

Mixed relay

Volleyball

Indoor volleyball

Men's tournament

Team roster
The following is the Mongolia roster in the men's volleyball tournament of the 2018 Asian Games. 

Head coach: Solongo Dorj

Pool B

13th–20th quarterfinal

17th place game

Weightlifting

Men

Women

Wrestling 

Mongolia entered 12 wrestlers ( 6 men's and 6 women's) at the Games. The contingent has collected two gold, a silver, and three bronze medals. On 3 September 2018, it was announced that Pürevdorjiin Orkhon had tested positive for Stanozolol in a urine test conducted on 20 August 2018. Violating the anti-doping rules, Orkhon was stripped of her gold medal.

Men's freestyle

Women's freestyle

References 

Nations at the 2018 Asian Games
2018
Asian Games